The Israeli Female Basketball Premier League or Ligat ha'Al (Hebrew : ליגת העל בכדורסל נשים), is a women's professional basketball league in Israel. It is currently composed of eleven teams.

The league was founded in 1957. Initially the most predominant teams in the league were veteran women basketball clubs such as Maccabi Tel Aviv and Hapoel Tel Aviv, who won almost yearly during the first two decades after the establishment of the league. This changed in 1976 when the team Elitzur Tel Aviv began winning all of the league's championships for 19 years straight. During the 1990s the trend again changed as the most prominent championship winners became Electra Ramat Hasharon and Elitzur Ramla. 

The champions of the 2010/2011 season were Elitzur Ramla. Elitzur Tel Aviv and Elitzur Holon share the distinction of having won the most championship trophies 20 amongst themselves., although the union that was established in 1990 between the two team was disbanded in 2008.

In 2011/12 season Maccabi Bnot Ashdod reached double winning, for the first time, national league and national cup in one season.

History

The League's teams (2022/23 season)

Championships by teams

References

External links
site reports 

League
Sports leagues established in 1957
Basketball
Basketball leagues in Israel
Israel
1957 establishments in Israel
Professional sports leagues in Israel